Moriertach Magenis was a priest in Ireland during the 15th century.

The Incumbent at Derryvullan, he was Archdeacon of Clogher until his death on 18 February 1441.

References

15th-century Irish Roman Catholic priests
Archdeacons of Clogher
1441 deaths